The Bezirk Neubrandenburg was a district (Bezirk) of East Germany. The administrative seat and the main town was Neubrandenburg.

History
The district was established, with the other 13, on 25 July 1952, substituting the old German states. After 3 October 1990 it was disestablished following German reunification, becoming again mostly part of the state of Mecklenburg-Vorpommern. Also rural districts of Prenzlau and Templin (on 3 October 1990), municipalities of Nechlin, Wollschow, Woddow, Bagemühl and Grünberg with city of Brüssow in Pasewalk district and municipalities of  Fahrenholz, Güterberg, Jagow, Lemmersdorf, Lübbenow, Milow, Trebenow, Wilsickow, Wismar (Uckerland) and Wolfshagen in Strasburg one part of the one of Brandenburg on 9 May 1992.

Geography

Position
The Bezirk Neubrandenburg bordered with the Bezirke of Rostock, Schwerin, Potsdam and Frankfurt (Oder). It bordered also with Poland and a little part of it was located by the Stettin Bay, a lagoon separated from the Baltic Sea.

Subdivision
The Bezirk was divided into 15 Kreise: 1 urban district (Stadtkreis) and 14 rural districts (Landkreise): 
Urban districts : Neubrandenburg.
Rural districts : ; Anklam; Demmin; Malchin; Neubrandenburg-Land; Neustrelitz; Pasewalk; Prenzlau; Röbel/Müritz; Strasburg; Templin; Teterow; Ueckermünde; Waren.

References

External links

Neubrandenburg
Former states and territories of Mecklenburg-Western Pomerania
20th century in Mecklenburg-Western Pomerania
Former states and territories of Brandenburg
20th century in Brandenburg
Neubrandenburg